Oliva multiplicata, common name the many-plaited olive, is a species of sea snail, a marine gastropod mollusk in the family Olividae, the olives.

Description
The length of the shell varies between 27 mm and 49 mm.

Distribution
This marine species occurs off Taiwan and from Japan to Indonesia.

References

External links
 

multiplicata
Gastropods described in 1850